The men's javelin throw event at the 1966 British Empire and Commonwealth Games was held on 6 August at the Independence Park in Kingston, Jamaica.

Results

References

Athletics at the 1966 British Empire and Commonwealth Games
1966